The 2001–02 Cincinnati Bearcats men's basketball team represented University of Cincinnati as a member of Conference USA during the 2001–02 NCAA Division I men's basketball season. The head coach was Bob Huggins, serving in his 13th year at the school. The team won regular season and Conference USA tournament titles to earn an automatic bid to the NCAA tournament as No. 1 seed in the West region. The Bearcats finished with a 31–4 record (14–2 C-USA).

Roster

Source

Schedule and results

|-
!colspan=12 style=|Regular Season 

|-
!colspan=12 style=|Conference USA Tournament 

|-
!colspan=12 style=|NCAA Tournament

Rankings

*AP did not release a Week 1 poll nor post-NCAA Tournament rankings

References

External links 
2001-02 Cincinnati Bearcats Roster and Stats at Sports-Reference.com

Cincinnati Bearcats men's basketball seasons
Cincinnati
Cincinnati
Cincin
Cincin